Events from the year 2009 in Sudan.

Incumbents
President: Omar al-Bashir
Vice President: 
 Salva Kiir Mayardit (First)
 Ali Osman Taha (Second)

Events
 May 15 - Sudan accused Chad for two air bombardments in its territory done by the Chadian government to attack Chadian rebel groups' bases in Sudan.

References

 
Years of the 21st century in Sudan
2000s in Sudan
Sudan
Sudan